Ugramm  is a 2014 Indian Kannada-language action thriller film directed by Prashanth Neel  and produced under the banner Inkfinite Pictures with his brother Pradeep Neel as the executive producer. It stars Srimurali and Haripriya as the lead pair, supported by Thilak Shekar, Atul Kulkarni, Avinash, Jai Jagadish and others. Bhuvan Gowda was the main cinematographer, while Ravi Varman was a guest cinematographer, marking his debut in Kannada cinema. 

Ugramm completed a run of 150 days in some theatres across Karnataka. A sequel to the film titled Ugramm Veeram to be made in 2015, was announced by Srimurali in July 2014, but there were no official updates till date. It was remade in Odia as Agastya starring Anubhav Mohanty. The Marathi remake titled Raanti starring Sharad Kelkar and Shanvi Srivastava was announced in August 2022.

Plot 
1994: Shivarudra Lingaiah was a ruthless gangster in the Bangalore crime syndicate, who agreed to take up a big smuggling deal, for which he approached Prabhakar, an owner of a shipping company, to smuggle the goods through his ships. However, Prabhakar rejected the offer. Enraged by the rejection, Shivarudra Lingaiah killed Prabhakar's wife and also threatened to kill his infant daughter, Nithya. As a result, Prabhakar accepted Shivarudra Lingaiah's offer. 

While working with Shivarudra Lingaiah, Prabhakar stopped a ship coming from Dubai, which contained the smuggled goods belonging to Shivarudra Lingaiah. He loaded 90% of the smuggled goods into another ship and sold it to a third party. Afterwards, he escaped to Australia, along with Nithya, to start a new life. Shivarudra Lingaiah was arrested from a tip-off, by Prabhakar. However, he continued his activities from the prison through his son, Dheeraj. 

2014: Shivarudra Lingaiah is now an MLA candidate, who along with Dheeraj, is awaiting to extract vengeance upon Prabhakar. A grown-up Nithya arrives at Bangalore to Talagavara to visit her late mother's grave and is kidnapped by Dheeraj's gang on the way. Agastya is an automobile mechanic, who saves her from Dheeraj's gang. He takes her to his house for safeguarding as advised by Prabhakar's family-friend, Vishwa. 

Meanwhile, a cat-and-mouse game ensues between Shivarudra Lingaiah and Agastya, where Agastya manages to save Nithya again. Nithya, who has fallen for Agastya learns from Vishwa about his dark past in Mughor, a region ruled by a blood-ridden syndicate. Agastya's old promise to his friend, Baala, had pushed Agastya to enter the crime syndicate. Within just a few years, Agastya managed to capture the entire region for Baala, against all odds. This earned him fearful respect and fame. 

However, Agastya's skirmish with Baala's younger brother Maara, led to Maara's death. Agastya had forced an exile upon himself, respecting his mother's vow to live a life free of violence. Dheeraj kills Shivarudra Lingaiah, deeming him weak and captures Nithya and relocates to Mughor, under the orders from Mughor's crime syndicate to seek vengeance on Agastya. Agastya returns to Mughor, where he faces the entire Mughor's criminal fraternity. He kills Dheeraj and saves Nithya again. Though still holding a deep grudge against Agastya for Maara's death, Baala allows them to leave, as a show of friendship towards Agastya. Agastya leaves Mughor to start a new life with Nithya.

Cast 
 Srimurali as Agasthya
 Haripriya as Nitya, Prabhakar's daughter
 Tilak Shekar as Baala
 Atul Kulkarni as Dheeraj, Shivarudra Lingaiah's son
 Avinash as Shivarudra Lingaiah
 Jai Jagadish as Prabhakar
 Padmaja Rao as Agasthya's Mother
 Giri as Malla
 Mithra as Seena

Production

Filming 
Ugramm was the first film ever to be shot outside the Bharat Gold Mines Limited cyanide dumps at Kolar Gold Fields. The other locations where the film was shot at include Kalaburagi as showcased as Mughor in filmand Bijapur District Chintamani, Kolar, Mysore, Gargeshwari, Nandigrama and Bangalore. Eight different cameras were used to suit different situations and locations.

Soundtrack 

The songs and background score were composed by Ravi Basrur with lyrics written by Ram Narayan, S. Sarvesh and Basrur. The soundtrack has six songs.

Reception 
Reviewing the soundtrack album, Kavya Christopher of The Times of India wrote, "Apart from the title track – Ugramm Veeram – which rightfully captures the essence of the title, translating to aggression, the rest of the numbers take you into a romantic journey of dream sequences that many stories try to rely on to bring in some breathing space in an otherwise adrenaline-packed plot."

Release 
The film made its theatrical release on 21 February 2014 in 142 theaters across Karnataka.

Reception 
Ugramm received positive reviews from critics and audience.

B. S. Srivani of Deccan Herald wrote of the film, "The screenplay is a beauty .. and dialogues .. do their job very well." and concluded by writing, "An overdose of violence to simple-minded families, Ugramm, however, is a treat for those looking for instant kicks." A. Sharadhaa of The New Indian Express wrote, "This is a landmark gangster film that balances commercial elements with a stirring screenplay." and concluded writing, " A very well-made film, Ugramm is full of action, drama and fleshed out characters." Shyam Prasad S. of Bangalore Mirror gave the film a rating out 3/5 and wrote, "The film is technically brilliant, but what it lacks is a style to the excessive energy that is drummed up." The Times of India gave the film a rating of 3.5/5 and wrote "Set in the North Karnataka region of Mughor, Ugramm keeps viewers hooked from the beginning with its lively script and brilliant narration. Though the loud background music drowns the dialogues at times, the action-packed sequences make up for all shortcomings."

Accolades

Box-office 
Ugramm opened strongly at the box-office and collected 5.5 crore  in Karnataka on first week.
It completed a 150-day run in theatres in Karnataka.

References

External links 
 

2014 films
2010s Kannada-language films
2014 action thriller films
2014 directorial debut films
Kannada films remade in other languages
Indian action thriller films
Indian films with live action and animation
Films directed by Prashanth Neel